The Ironworkers Memorial Second Narrows Crossing, also called the Ironworkers Memorial Bridge and Second Narrows Bridge, is the second bridge constructed at the Second (east) Narrows of Burrard Inlet in Vancouver, British Columbia, Canada. Originally named the Second Narrows Bridge, it connects Vancouver to the North Shore of Burrard Inlet, which includes the District of North Vancouver, the City of North Vancouver, and West Vancouver. It was constructed adjacent to the older Second Narrows Bridge, which is now exclusively a rail bridge. Its construction, from 1956 to 1960, was marred by a multi-death collapse on June 17, 1958.

The bridge is a steel truss cantilever bridge, designed by Swan Wooster Engineering Co. Ltd. Construction began in November 1957, and the bridge was officially opened on August 25, 1960. It cost approximately $23 million to build. Tolls were charged until April 1, 1963.

It is part of the Trans-Canada Highway (Highway 1).

Collapse

On June 17, 1958, as a crane stretched from the north side of the new bridge to join the two chords of the unfinished arch, several spans collapsed. Seventy-nine workers plunged  into the water. Eighteen were killed either instantly or shortly thereafter, possibly drowned by their heavy tool belts. A diver searching for bodies drowned later, bringing the total fatalities for the collapse to nineteen. In a subsequent Royal Commission inquiry, the bridge collapse was attributed to miscalculation by bridge engineers. A temporary arm, holding the fifth anchor span, was deemed too light to bear the weight.

In December 1957, a safety inspector from the British Columbia Workmen's Compensation Board had reported that the installation of a safety net under the work platforms was "impracticable" following the death of another steelworker.

Renaming
The bridge was renamed the "Ironworkers Memorial Second Narrows Crossing" on June 17, 1994, to honour the eighteen workers who died in the collapse, along with one rescue diver and four other workers who also died during the construction process.

In popular culture
Stompin' Tom Connors paid a musical tribute to the fallen ironworkers with the song "The Bridge Came Tumbling Down" on his 1972 album My Stompin' Grounds. (This tune also appears on several later compilations one of which was performed by Les Claypool's Duo de Twang). Jimmy Dean's 1962 song "Steel Men" is a ballad about the Second Narrows bridge disaster. Gary Geddes' 2007 book of poetry, entitled Falsework, is based on the collapse of the bridge.

Bibliography
 Jamieson, Eric, Tragedy at Second Narrows: The Story of the Ironworkers Memorial Bridge, Harbour Publishing, 2008.

Notes
 On February 2, 2009, several University of British Columbia engineering students were arrested while attempting to suspend the shell of a Volkswagen Beetle under the bridge as part of an "Engineering Week" tradition.

See also 
 List of bridges in Canada
 List of bridge disasters

References

External links 

History of Metropolitan Vancouver
Satellite image of the Ironworkers Memorial Bridge and Second Narrows Bridge
Vancouver, BC Bridge Under Construction Collapses, June 1958 at GenDisasters.com

Bridges in Greater Vancouver
Cantilever bridges
Bridges completed in 1960
Transport in North Vancouver (district municipality)
Bridge disasters in Canada
Bridge disasters caused by engineering error
Disasters in British Columbia
History of Vancouver
Labor monuments and memorials
Road bridges in British Columbia
Bridges on the Trans-Canada Highway
Monuments and memorials in British Columbia
Buildings and structures in Vancouver
Former toll bridges in Canada
1958 disasters in Canada